The little green sunbird (Anthreptes seimundi), also called Seimund's sunbird, is a species of bird in the family Nectariniidae. It is sometimes placed in the genus Nectarinia. It is found in Angola, Cameroon, Central African Republic, Republic of the Congo, Democratic Republic of the Congo, Ivory Coast, Equatorial Guinea, Gabon, Ghana, Liberia, Nigeria, Rwanda, Sierra Leone, South Sudan, Tanzania, Togo, and Uganda.

Description 
The little green sunbird is small, light yellow, and warbler-like; overall similar to the Bates's sunbird. It is 9 cm (about 3.5 inches) long. The beak is slightly curved and has a small amount of pink. Around the eye is a pale ring. The cry is high pitched.

Name 
The little green sunbird's binomial classification Anthreptes seimundi comes from its genus and Eibert Carl Henry Seimund, a British Taxidermist.

Subspecies
A. s. seimundi: Bioko (Gulf of Guinea)
A. s. kruensis: Guinea and Sierra Leone to Ghana and Togo.
A. s. minor: southern Nigeria and southern Cameroon east to Central African Republic, southern South Sudan, Uganda, and Rwanda, south to northern Angola and central Democratic Republic of the Congo.

Gallery

References

little green sunbird
Birds of Central Africa
Birds of West Africa
little green sunbird
Taxonomy articles created by Polbot